Patrick Grappin (or Grapin; born 22 October 1955) is a French former professional football player and manager.

Playing career 
Grappin played for Roubaix, RC France, Rennes, and Malakoff in his early career. He participated in one game with Paris Saint-Germain during the 1979–80 season, a 2–1 Division 1 loss to Nancy on 22 September 1979. Her went on to play 9 years with Poissy after leaving PSG.

Managerial career 
Grappin took charge as manager of Poissy in 1989 after retiring from football. He would later take the position of sporting director at the club in 1993, and left in 1998.

Notes

References 

Living people
1955 births
French footballers
Association football defenders
RC Roubaix players
Racing Club de France Football players
Stade Rennais F.C. players
USM Malakoff (football) players
Paris Saint-Germain F.C. players
AS Poissy players
Ligue 2 players
French Division 3 (1971–1993) players
Ligue 1 players
French Division 4 (1978–1993) players

French football managers
AS Poissy managers
French Division 4 (1978–1993) managers
French Division 3 (1971–1993) managers